Ruairidh Campbell (born 1998) is a Scottish professional rugby union referee who represents the Scottish Rugby Union.

Rugby union career

Referee career

Professional career

He has refereed in the Scottish Premiership. He refereed 52 matches in season 2018-19 and won the Crabbies Referee of the Season award.

He refereed in the Amsterdam Sevens in 2018.

He refereed his first Super 6 match on 24 November 2019; Watsonians v Stirling County.

Campbell is part of the Borders Rugby Referee Society and the SRU panel.

International career

Campbell refereed the U18 match between Ireland and English Counties in April 2019.

Campell has been Assistant Referee for the Lithuania v Switzerland match.

Outside of rugby

Campbell has written various articles for the online Young Perspective newspaper and for the Scottish Rugby Blog. He is a keen runner and runs for the University of Glasgow.

References

Living people
Scottish rugby union referees
Rugby union officials
1995 births
Super 6 referees